The North Fork Siuslaw River is a tributary of the Siuslaw River in Lane County in the United States state of Oregon. It is formed by the confluence of Sam Creek and West Branch in the Siuslaw National Forest of the Central Oregon Coast Range. The former community of Pawn was once at the juncture of the two creeks.

Recreation
The United States Forest Service maintains the North Fork Siuslaw Campground along the river north of Minerva. Generally open from May 1 to December 1, it has seven dispersed campsites and a vault toilet but no drinking water.

The river, which supports populations of Chinook salmon, cutthroat trout, and steelhead, is open to fishing from boats downstream of Minerva and from the bank further upstream. Wild steelhead fishing is limited to catch and release. Bender Landing County Park, off North Fork Road near Florence, has a boat ramp, picnic tables, toilets, and access to fishing.

Tributaries
Sam Creek and West Branch form the river. Downstream of this from source to mouth, tributaries enter as follows: Cedar, Taylor, and Deadman creeks, all from the left; Porter, Wilhelm, and Drew creeks, right; Cataract, McLeod, and South Johns creeks, left; Stout Canyon, right, and Stout Creek, left.

Then Shumard Creek, left; Russell Creek, right; South Russell Creek, left; Jim Dick, Condon, and Culver creeks, right; Bellstrom Canyon, left, and Morris, Haring, Slover, and Lindsley creeks, right.

See also
List of rivers of Oregon

References

Rivers of Oregon
Rivers of Lane County, Oregon